Striguny is a rural locality (a selo) and the administrative center of Strigunovskoye Rural Settlement, Borisovsky District, Belgorod Oblast, Russia. The population was 1,913 as of 2010. There are 12 streets.

Geography 
Striguny is located 8 km southwest of Borisovka (the district's administrative centre) by road. Zarechnoye is the nearest rural locality.

References 

Rural localities in Borisovsky District
Grayvoronsky Uyezd